Swabi is a tehsil located in Swabi District, Khyber Pakhtunkhwa, Pakistan.

Administration
Swabi is administratively subdivided into thirty nine Union Councils, namely:

Adina, Asota, Bachai, Bam Khel, Batakara, Chak Noda, Dagai, Gabasni, Gandaf, Gani Chatra, Gar Munara, Ismaila, Boko-Jhanda, Kabgant, Kalabat, Kalu Khan, Karnal Sher Killi, Kotha, Maini, Maneri Bala, Maneri Payan, Marghuz, Naranji, Pabeni, Panj Pir, Parmoli, Saleem Khan, Shahmansoor, Sheikh Jana, Shewa, Swabi, Swabi Maneri, Tarakai, Thand Kohi, Topi east, Topi west, Turlandi, Zaida, Zarobi.

References

Populated places in Swabi District
Tehsils of Khyber Pakhtunkhwa